From the 19th into the early 20th there were many  and  gauge railways in existence Bulgaria, some were dismantled and others were converted to standard gauge.

Septemvri–Dobrinishte

The picturesque  Septemvri–Dobrinishte narrow-gauge line is 125 km long and features many tunnels, bridges, spiral loops and last but not least the highest railway station in the Balkans, namely Avramovo Station situated at 1267 m altitude. The line is still used for regional services by no less than 5 pairs of diesel-hauled trains per day as of the 2011 Timetable.
There are a couple of preserved steam locomotives, but as of 2010 only 609.76 is operational and occasionally hauls tourist trains along the line. There are plans for restoration of the other preserved engines, but when would this happen is still unclear.

Other railways
Other examples in Bulgaria include the  children railways in Plovdiv and Kurdzhali and the industrial railway of the Burgas salt pans.

The greater part of the extensive Sofia Tramway network is  metre gauge.

See also

Rail transport in Bulgaria
List of railway lines in Bulgaria

References

External links